Flyleaf may refer to:

In book design, a blank leaf in the front or back cover
 Flyleaf (band), an American rock band
 Flyleaf (EP), a 2004 EP by the band of the same name
 Flyleaf (album), a 2005 album by the band of the same name
 Flyleaf discography
 Flyleaf Press, a publishing company in Dublin, Ireland